Mary-Anne Wallace is an Australian Paralympic swimmer with a vision impairment. At the 1984 New York/Stoke Mandeville Games, she won a gold medal in the Women's 400 m Freestyle B3 event, a silver medal in the Women's 100 m Butterfly B3 event, and two bronze medals in the Women's 100 m Freestyle B3 and Women's 200 m Individual Medley B3 events.

References

Female Paralympic swimmers of Australia
Swimmers at the 1984 Summer Paralympics
Medalists at the 1984 Summer Paralympics
Paralympic swimmers with a vision impairment
Paralympic gold medalists for Australia
Paralympic silver medalists for Australia
Paralympic bronze medalists for Australia
Paralympic medalists in swimming
Australian female freestyle swimmers
Australian female butterfly swimmers
Australian female medley swimmers
Australian blind people
20th-century Australian women
Year of birth missing (living people)
Living people